Nancy K. MacLean is an American historian. She is the William H. Chafe Professor of History and Public Policy at Duke University. MacLean's research focuses on race, gender, labor history and social movements in 20th century U.S. history, with particular attention to the U.S. South.

Academic career 
In 1981, MacLean completed a four-year, combined-degree, B.A./M.A program in history at Brown University, graduating magna cum laude. In 1989, she received a Ph.D. in history from the University of Wisconsin-Madison, where she studied under Linda Gordon. MacLean's doctoral thesis later became her first book, published as Behind the Mask of Chivalry: The Making of the Second Ku Klux Klan (1994).

From 1989 to 2010 MacLean taught at Northwestern University, where she served as chairperson of the Department of History, and as the Peter B. Ritzma Professor in the Humanities. MacLean spoke in favor of and participated in the Living Wage Campaign.

In 2010, MacLean moved to Duke University. She served as co-chair of Scholars for a Progressive North Carolina (SPNC), which has since been renamed Scholars for North Carolina's Future (SNCF). In 2013, MacLean participated in SPNC panels and forums held in opposition to the legislative agenda of Republican majority of the North Carolina General Assembly.

Work

Behind the Mask of Chivalry (1994) 
Behind the Mask of Chivalry: The Making of the Second Ku Klux Klan, published in 1994, explores how some five million ordinary, white Protestant men joined the second Ku Klux Klan in the 1920s. MacLean argued that the Ku Klux Klan was an organization “at once mainstream and extreme” that was hostile to both big government and to unionism; that Klan philosophy was anti-elitist and anti-black, but that their patriarchal stance for family values helped achieve a mass following; and that they demonstrated political affinity with the varieties of European fascism of the 1920s.

Reception
Behind the Mask of Chivalry received four scholarly awards, and reviewers said it is "a remarkable, readable, and important book," especially for students of the American South, of African American history, and of political violence in the U.S., which is characterized by an "ambitious scope" and "graced by artful, energetic prose." The Organization of American Historians awarded the James A. Rawley Prize to Behind the Mask of Chivalry. However, William D. Jenkins said that MacLean's historical analysis is "well-written, yet flawed," because it is "too readily dismissive of the influence of religious and cultural beliefs on human activity." In the Journal of the History of the Behavioral Sciences, J. Morgan Kousser offered a critical review, saying that "MacLean makes elementary errors long identified by sociologists and historians.

Freedom Is Not Enough (2006) 
Freedom Is Not Enough: The Opening of the American Workplace, published in 2006 by Harvard University Press and the Russell Sage Foundation, traces the ways in which civil rights activism produced a seismic shift in U.S. workplaces, from an environment in which discrimination and a "culture of exclusion" were the norm to one that accepted and even celebrated diversity and inclusion.

Reception
The book received praise as a "superb and provocative" interpretation of civil rights history, and as an example of "contemporary history at its best." It won seven awards, including the Taft Award for labor history and the Hurst Award for legal history. Kenneth W. Mack praised MacLean for having helped to re-integrate legal frameworks into the discussion of civil rights after it had been neglected by historians.

Democracy in Chains (2017) 

In 2017 MacLean published Democracy in Chains: The Deep History of the Radical Right's Stealth Plan for America. This book focused on the Nobel Memorial Prize in Economic Sciences-winning political economist James McGill Buchanan and his work developing public choice theory, as well as the roles of Charles Koch and others, in nurturing the libertarian movement in the United States. MacLean argued that these figures undertook "a stealth bid to reverse-engineer all of America, at both the state and national levels back to the political economy and oligarchic governance of midcentury Virginia, minus the segregation." According to MacLean, Buchanan represents "the true origin story of today’s well-heeled radical right."

Honors 

In 1995 MacLean received the Frank L. and Harriet C. Owsley Prize from the Southern Historical Association. In 2010, she was elected a Fellow of the Society of American Historians. In 2007, she received the Philip Taft Labor History Book Award of the Labor and Working Class Studies Association. In 2007 she received the Allan Sharlin Book Award for the best book in social science history from the Social Science History Association. In 2007 she received the Willard Hurst Prize for best book in socio-legal history from the Law and Society Association. In 2007 she received the Labor History Best Book Prize from the International Association of Labor History Institutions. Democracy in Chains was a finalist for the 2017 National Book Award for nonfiction, a finalist for the "Los Angeles Times Book Award in Current Interest", and the winner of the Lannar Foundation Cultural Freedom Award. The book was also named "Most Valuable Book of 2017" by The Nation. In 2018, Democracy in Chains won the Lillian Smith Book Award, for "books that are outstanding creative achievements, worthy of recognition because of their literary merit, moral vision, and honest representation of the South, its people, problems, and promises."

Books

References

External links 
 

1959 births
21st-century American historians
Duke University faculty
Living people
Northwestern University faculty
Brown University alumni
University of Wisconsin–Madison College of Letters and Science alumni
Presidents of the Labor and Working-Class History Association